Ellen Wong (born January 13, 1985) is a Canadian actress. She is known for her roles as Knives Chau in the 2010 film Scott Pilgrim vs. the World, Jill "Mouse" Chen in The CW's series The Carrie Diaries, and Jenny Chey in the Netflix series GLOW.

Early life
Wong was born in Scarborough, Ontario, to Teochew-speaking Chinese Cambodian parents who fled to Canada during the Cambodian genocide. She began acting in community theatre while attending L'Amoreaux Collegiate Institute and worked in a variety of television production jobs from the age of 14. She later studied radio and television arts at Ryerson University (now Toronto Metropolitan University).

Career
Wong continued acting while at university, and in 2005, she landed a role in the television series This Is Wonderland followed by Runaway in 2006. She also has a black belt in taekwondo, but had to stop sparring competitively due to her acting schedule. Wong's martial arts background helped her land the role of Knives Chau in Scott Pilgrim vs. the World in January 2009. She auditioned for the part three times. On her second audition director Edgar Wright was surprised to find out that she studied taekwondo and was intrigued by this "sweetfaced young lady being a secret badass". Wong expressed that the role of Knives Chau caught her eye because "it's not every day that as an Asian female, you get to be able to read a role that's empowering, that has a great arc, and that's so integral to the story as a whole".

Wong also appeared in the television show Unnatural History. In 2011, she had a recurring role as Nurse Suzy Chao in the Global/ABC series Combat Hospital. In January 2012, she was nominated for an ACTRA Award for Outstanding Performance by a Female for her work portraying an illegal immigrant smuggled across the ocean in a shipping container in the short film Silent Cargo. In February 2012, Wong was cast in the Sex and the City prequel series The Carrie Diaries, playing Jill "Mouse" Chen, Carrie's best friend from high school who is described as "pragmatic, bright, and super loyal". In 2012 she also starred in Silent Night, a loose remake of the 1984 horror film Silent Night, Deadly Night.

In June 2016, Wong was cast in the second season of the Syfy series Dark Matter, and in October, she was cast in the Netflix comedy series GLOW, which was inspired by the 1980s female professional wrestling league of the same name. In the series, Wong plays Jenny, an immigrant from Cambodia who is obsessed with pop culture. Wong was initially dismayed to find out the character's wrestling persona was named "Fortune Cookie" but stated, "What is really awesome about GLOW is that we play these two characters. In the ring, you are these stereotypes. But then you see who these characters are in real life outside of the ring and how they feel... Jenny is trying to be this all-American girl in the '80s, and she's basically trying to fight all these stereotypes and at the same time here she is playing this stereotype." The creators of the series wrote the character's background as Cambodian after several meetings with Wong.

In 2017, Wong appeared in the thriller film The Circle, starring Emma Watson and Tom Hanks, and in Katy Perry's music video for "Swish Swish" as her character from GLOW. That August, Wong joined the Audience television network series, Condor, in a recurring role. In December 2019, Wong joined the cast of the Michael Caine and Aubrey Plaza comedy Best Sellers.

In 2020, she appeared in the Christmas television film The Christmas Setup.

Filmography

Awards and nominations

References

External links

 

21st-century Canadian actresses
Actresses from Toronto
Canadian actresses of Cambodian descent
Canadian actresses of Chinese descent
Canadian female taekwondo practitioners
Canadian film actresses
Canadian television actresses
Living people
People from Scarborough, Toronto
Toronto Metropolitan University alumni
Year of birth missing (living people)
1985 births